Jämijärvi is a municipality of Finland.

It is located in the province of Western Finland and is part of the Satakunta region.

The municipality is unilingually Finnish.

Jämijärvi Airfield is one of the busiest general aviation airfields in Finland. A serious aviation accident happened in Jämijärvi in April 2014.

References

External links

Municipality of Jämijärvi – Official website

Municipalities of Satakunta
Populated places established in 1865